Binboğa is a village in Afşin district of Kahramanmaraş Province, southern Turkey.

As of 2018, the population of the village was 235, decreasing from 303 in 2010. 303.

References

Afşin (district)
Villages in Kahramanmaraş Province